Rózsa is a Hungarian language surname or female given name, which is equivalent to the English name Rose. The surname Rózsa is derived from the given name. Variants of the name include Rozsa, Rózsák, Rózsás, and Rozsas. The name may refer to:

Given name 
Rózsa Csillag (1832–1892), Austro-Hungarian opera singer
Rózsa Darázs (born 1987), Hungarian speed-skater
Rózsa Hoffmann (born 1948), Hungarian politician 
Rózsa Péter (1905–1977), Hungarian mathematician

Surname
Dániel Rózsa (born 1984), Hungarian football player
Eduardo Rózsa-Flores (1960–2009), Hungarian journalist
Endre Rózsa (1941–1995), Hungarian poet
János Rózsás (born 1937), Hungarian film director
Johnny Rozsa (born 1946), American photographer
Miklós Rózsa (1907–1995), Hungarian composer
Norbert Rózsa (born 1972), Hungarian swimmer
Sándor Rózsa (1813–1878), Hungarian outlaw
Vera Rózsa (1917–2010), Hungarian singer

See also
Rose (disambiguation)
Rosen
Rózsavölgyi

References

Hungarian feminine given names
Hungarian-language surnames
hu:Rózsa (keresztnév)